Ameugny is a commune in the Saône-et-Loire department in the Bourgogne-Franche-Comté region in eastern France.

Geography
The commune lies in the south of the department. The river Grosne flows through the commune.

Population

See also
Communes of the Saône-et-Loire department

References

External links
 Official website
 Ameugny Notre-Dame

Communes of Saône-et-Loire